The Human Rights Commission of Salt Lake City, Utah, is a commission that works with the city government on issues related to the human rights of its citizens.

Establishment
A city ordinance of October 2005 has established the Salt Lake City Human Rights Commission, on the model of similar organizations throughout the country. The new mayor Ralph Becker has renamed the old Office of Ethnic Minorities, established by mayor Rocky Anderson, the Office of Diversity and Human Rights. The present director is Yolanda Francisco-Nez. The Human Rights Commission will serve as an advisory board to this Office.  Members of the Commission must receive the approval of the City Council. They serve for two or four years.

Purpose
The major purpose of the Human Rights Commission is to advise and help the city government to check and eliminate "all discriminatory practices on the grounds of age, ancestry, color, disability, gender, national origin, marital status, medical condition, physical limitation, race, religion, or sexual orientation, because they adversely affect the general welfare of the city and the vitality of its neighborhoods."

Activity
Since January 2006, the HR Commission has met regularly every month. Subcommittees have been organized to deal with various issues.

Current members
Christopher Wharton, Chair  Curtis Haring, Vice Chair  Jennifer Mayer-Glenn, Secretary  Esperanza Granados  Walter Jones  Jon Jepsen  Keri Jones

See also
Human Rights Commission
Human rights in the United States
National and Ethnic Cultures of Utah
Salt Lake City Law and Government Salt Lake City#Law and government

Notes

External links
Official website of the Office of Diversity and Human Rights of SLC
IAOHRA - International Association of Official Human Rights Agencies
Human Rights Education Center of Utah
Utah Ethnic Office
Utah Government Antidiscrimination Office - Member of IAOHRA
Utan Health and Human Rights Projects
Center for Nonviolent Human Rights Advocacy

Human rights in the United States
Human rights organizations based in the United States
Politics of Utah
2005 establishments in Utah
Government agencies established in 2005